Yandy Díaz Fernández (born August 8, 1991) is a Cuban-born professional baseball third baseman and first baseman for the Tampa Bay Rays of Major League Baseball (MLB). He previously played for the Cleveland Indians.

Cuban career 
Diaz played for the Naranjas de Villa Clara in the 2012-13 Cuban National Series.

In 2013, at 21 years old, Diaz defected from Holguin, Cuba to Monte Cristi, Dominican Republic alongside his childhood friend Leandro Linares and another unnamed individual.  He had previously attempted to defect twice, both times which he was caught and arrested by the Cuban government. In August, he signed with the Cleveland Indians for $300,000.

American career

Minor Leagues 
Díaz played for the Carolina Mudcats of the Class A-Advanced Carolina League in 2014. Playing for the Akron RubberDucks of the Class AA Eastern League in 2015, Díaz was named an All-Star. The Indians promoted him to the Columbus Clippers of the Class AAA International League in September, and assigned him to the Arizona Fall League after the 2015 regular season. Díaz began the 2016 season with Akron and was subsequently promoted to Columbus, where he won the International League Rookie of the Year Award.

Cleveland Indians 
Díaz earned a non-roster invitation to the Indians' 2017 major league spring training camp. After batting .458 (22-for-48) with a 1.252 OPS during spring training, and after injuries to other players forced the Indians to adjust their roster, Díaz was named the Indians' starting third baseman for the start of the 2017 season. Diaz played 49 games, slashing .262/.352/.327 predominantly playing third base.

Diaz spent the 2018 season between Columbus and the Cleveland Indians, playing 39 games and slashing .312/.375/.422 with one home run and 15 RBIs.

Tampa Bay Rays 
On December 13, 2018, the Indians traded Díaz to the Tampa Bay Rays in a three-team trade in which the Rays also acquired Cole Sulser for Jake Bauers, and the Seattle Mariners acquired Edwin Encarnación from the Indians for Carlos Santana. Díaz missed some time due to injury during the season, only accumulating 307 at bats. He did hit 14 home runs and 38 RBI.

Díaz hit two home runs in the 2019 American League Wild Card Game as the Rays defeated the Oakland Athletics.

Although plagued by a hamstring injury in September 2020, Díaz appeared in 34 games of the abbreviated 2020 season, slashing .307/.428/.386 with 2 home runs and 11 RBI.

Personal life
His father, Jorge, also defected from Cuba to play professional baseball in the United States. Yandy was six years old when he last saw his father. Diaz is of Afro-Cuban descent.

See also
 List of baseball players who defected from Cuba

References

External links

1991 births
Living people
Akron RubberDucks players
Carolina Mudcats players
Cleveland Indians players
Columbus Clippers players
Defecting Cuban baseball players
Leones del Caracas players
Cuban expatriate baseball players in Venezuela
Major League Baseball players from Cuba
Cuban expatriate baseball players in the United States
Major League Baseball third basemen
Naranjas de Villa Clara players
Scottsdale Scorpions players
Tampa Bay Rays players
People from Sagua la Grande